Clancy Branch is a stream in the U.S. state of Missouri. It is a tributary of Maddin Creek.

Clancy Branch has the name of the local Clancy family.

See also
List of rivers of Missouri

References

Rivers of Washington County, Missouri
Rivers of Missouri